Lydia Ko  (born 24 April 1997) is a New Zealand professional golfer and the No. 1-ranked woman professional golfer as of January 2023.

Ko had much success from an early age holding many youngest accolades on the LPGA Tour. Until 2017, she is the youngest ever (age 15) to win an LPGA Tour event. In August 2013, she became the only amateur to win two LPGA Tour events. Upon winning The Evian Championship in France on 13 September 2015, she became the youngest woman, at age , to win a major championship. Her closing round of 63 was a record lowest final round in the history of women's golf majors, but she lowered that record with a 62 at the 2021 ANA Inspiration. She had previously won the ANA Inspiration on 3 April 2016 for her second consecutive major championship, where she also became the youngest player to win two women's major championships.

In 2014, Ko was named as one of Time magazine's 100 most influential people. In both 2014 and 2015, Ko was named in the EspnW Impact25 list of 25 athletes and influencers who have made the greatest impact for women in sports.

In 2016, Ko was named  Young New Zealander of the Year, and in the 2019 New Year Honours, she was appointed a Member of the New Zealand Order of Merit for services to golf. 

In November 2022, Ko won the CME Group Tour Championship with its $2 million first-place prize, completing the LPGA Tour season with three wins, the LPGA Player of the Year award for the second time in her career, the Vare Trophy for the lowest scoring average, the 2022 leading money winner, and rose to number two in the Women's World Golf Rankings.

Ko is a player director on the LPGA Board.

Early life and education
Ko was born on 24 April 1997 in Seoul, South Korea, and emigrated with her family to New Zealand when she was four, gaining New Zealand citizenship at age 12. She began playing golf as a five-year-old when her mother took her into a pro shop at the Pupuke Golf Club on Auckland's North Shore owned by professional Guy Wilson, who coached her until 22 December 2013. She was a seven-year-old in March 2005 when she first came to the attention of the media, for competing in the New Zealand national amateur championships. She was educated at Mairangi Bay Primary and Pinehurst School in Albany, New Zealand, and when she joined the professional golf tour she took correspondence classes with Pinehurst. Starting in 2015 Ko said she would study psychology extramurally with Korea University, Seoul. The Yonhap news agency reported her as saying "I'll have to listen to what the university says to decide how I will do my studies. I'll have to make sure I submit the required papers and projects as the majority of my classes will be done online."

2012 Women's NSW Open
On 29 January 2012, Ko became the youngest person ever to win a professional golf tour event by winning the Bing Lee/Samsung Women's NSW Open on the ALPG Tour. She was 14 at the time, and had placed second in the event the year before. The previous youngest person ever to win a professional golf tour event was Japan's Ryo Ishikawa at age 15 years and 8 months. Her record as the youngest winner of a professional event was broken later in 2012 by 14-year-old Canadian Brooke Henderson, who won the second event on that year's Canadian Women's Tour on 13 June.

2012 and 2013 CN Canadian Women's Open
On 26 August 2012, at the age of 15 years and four months, Ko became the youngest-ever winner of an LPGA Tour event, winning with a score of 275 (−13) at the CN Canadian Women's Open. She surpassed the record set by Lexi Thompson at 16 years and seven months in September 2011. Her win also made her only the fifth amateur to have won an LPGA Tour event, and the first in over 43 years. The 2012 CN Canadian Women's Open was a 72-hole event with a purse of $2 million; the winner's share of $300,000 went to runner-up Inbee Park who was three strokes back.

Ko successfully defended her win at the 2013 CN Canadian Open, shooting 265 (−15) for a five-stroke victory over Karine Icher at the Royal Mayfair Club in Edmonton. The $300,000 winner's share went to Icher.

Professional career
After finishing runner-up to Suzann Pettersen in The Evian Championship in France, Ko announced that she would turn pro in 2014. However, on 23 October 2013, she stated in a YouTube video featuring New Zealand rugby player Israel Dagg that she was turning professional immediately and would play her first professional tournament in Florida in mid-November. She had been the top-ranked woman amateur golfer in the world for 130 weeks when she announced she was turning professional on 23 October 2013. She finished tied for 21st in her pro debut at the 2013 CME Group Titleholders.

In October 2013, the LPGA Tour granted Ko's request to join the LPGA, waiving the Tour's requirement of members being at least 18 years old. "It is not often that the LPGA welcomes a rookie who is already a back-to-back LPGA Tour champion," tour commissioner Mike Whan said when he granted Ko's request.

In November 2013, Ko began working with swing coach David Leadbetter.

2014
Ko won three tournaments in 2014.  On 27 April 2014, she earned her first LPGA Tour win as a professional and her first win on U.S. soil, by winning the Swinging Skirts LPGA Classic. She celebrated her 17th birthday during this tournament. In July, she won her second tournament of the year, the Marathon Classic. In November 2014, she won her third tournament of the season, the season ending CME Group Tour Championship. She won the LPGA Rookie of the Year. Ko commemorated the occasion with the inscription "IV-XXVII-XIV" (4-27-14 in Roman numerals), on her right wrist.

2015
Ko won five times in 2015. On 2 February 2015, she became the No. 1 ranked woman professional golfer after a runner-up finish at the Coates Golf Championship, overtaking Inbee Park. On 22 February 2015, Ko won her first event of the 2015 LPGA Tour season at the ISPS Handa Women's Australian Open. The win was her sixth on the LPGA Tour, and her ninth victory overall. The following week, Ko returned home and won her tenth professional championship at the ISPS Handa New Zealand Women's Open. The victory in this tournament was her second of the 2015 season, the win was also her third on the Ladies European Tour, and fourth with ALPG Tour. Highlighted in her victory at New Zealand was her LET low-round tying and course record 61 during the second round.

At the first major of the 2015 season, the ANA Inspiration, Ko shot a 1-under-par 71 in the first round on 2 April, tying her with Annika Sörenstam for the all-time LPGA record for consecutive rounds under par, at 29. Three weeks later, Ko would win her second LPGA Tour event of the 2015 season, when she beat Morgan Pressel in a playoff to win the Swinging Skirts LPGA Classic. She would defeat Pressel with birdie on the second playoff hole. The victory was her seventh overall on tour, and her second win at the event in as many years. Her win was also her third win worldwide in 2015. The victory would be the second time she has defended a championship on tour. The playoff win was also her second on tour, bringing her playoff record to 2–0. Ko would go on to miss the cut at the 2015 KPMG Women's PGA Championship. The missed cut would be her first in her fourteen major championship appearances.  She would find solid success in her next two major championships with a T12 finish at the 2015 U.S. Women's Open, and a T3 finish at the 2015 Ricoh Women's British Open.

On 23 August 2015, Ko won her third Canadian Pacific Women's Open in a playoff against Stacy Lewis. She defeated Lewis, with par on the first hole of the playoff.  The victory was the eighth for Ko on the LPGA Tour, and the third of the 2015 season, and fourth win worldwide for her in 2015. The playoff victory was also her third win in such circumstances, and would bring her career LPGA playoff record to 3–0.

On 13 September 2015, Ko won the fifth and final major on the 2015 LPGA calendar, the 2015 Evian Championship. She dominated the final round with eight birdies, winning by six shots over second-place finisher Lexi Thompson. Her 63 was the lowest-ever closing round score in a women's major championship. It was Ko's fourth win on the LPGA Tour in 2015, ninth on the LPGA Tour overall and fourth on the Ladies European Tour. Ko's victory also made her the youngest major champion in the history of the LPGA Tour and the youngest major champion in golf since Young Tom Morris, when he won the 1868 Open Championship.

On 26 October 2015, Ko became the youngest player to win 10 events on a major tour at age  surpassing Horton Smith who set the PGA Tour mark of 21 years, 7 months in 1929, and Nancy Lopez who set the previous LPGA Tour record in 1979 at 22 years, 2 months, 5 days.

On 22 November 2015, Ko won the LPGA Rolex Player of the Year Award by two points over Inbee Park, making her the youngest winner in the 49 years of the award.

2016

Ko won four times in 2016. Ko's 2016 started where she left off from 2015, winning the ISPS Handa New Zealand Women's Open for a third time in four years by two shots from Choi Hye-jin, Felicity Johnson, and Nanna Koerstz Madsen. Just 11 minutes before she was due to tee off for her final round, an earthquake struck, with Ko vowing to donate her prize money to charity to help those affected.

On the LPGA Tour, Ko won the Kia Classic in March with a four-shot margin over Inbee Park, and the following week, on 3 April, she made it consecutive major titles with a one-shot victory at the ANA Inspiration. The win strengthened her position as No. 1 in the world as she became the youngest double major winner in the history of the game since Young Tom Morris at the 1869 Open Championship. Later, she added two more victories on the LPGA Tour at the Walmart NW Arkansas Championship and Marathon Classic. In August, she represented New Zealand at the 2016 Summer Olympics, where she won the silver medal. Ko was runner-up for the Vare Trophy (lowest scoring average) for a second consecutive year; however, last year's difference of 0.026 was, literally, twice as much as this year's 0.013 which separated her from winner Chun In-gee.

Following the 2016 season, Ko announced that she had signed an equipment sponsorship contract with Parson's Xtreme Golf (PXG), ending her use of Callaway equipment. Ko also announced in December that she had parted ways with both her caddie and swing coach David Leadbetter, who had been coaching Ko since November 2013.

2017
Ko entered 26 events and finished in the top-10 ten times. Her year-end world ranking dropped to ninth. She started her 2017 LPGA Tour season at the ISPS Handa Women's Australian Open where she finished tied for 46th. She then had three consecutive top-10 finishes at the Honda LPGA Thailand, HSBC Women's Champions, and the Bank of Hope Founders Cup. In her fifth event of the season, Ko missed just her second LPGA Tour cut at the Kia Classic with rounds of 74 and 72. She then defended her ANA Inspiration title at the 2017 ANA Inspiration event. She opened with two rounds of 70, followed by a third-round 71, and rounded out the year's first major with a third round of 70 to finish in a tie for 11th place. In her seventh start of 2017, she closed with rounds of 65 and 64 to finish tied for second place at the Lotte Championship, her best finish of the season. She had back-to-back top-10 finishes at the Citibanamex Lorena Ochoa Match Play and Kingsmill Championship where she ended T-9 and T-10, respectively.

Ko ended the 2017 season with a scoring average of 68.86 which ranked her No. 9 and a total season earnings of $1,177,450 which put her at No. 13 on the season's money list. This was the fourth consecutive season in which she won at least $1,000,000.

The season ending CME Group Tour Championship was Ko's 100th tournament on the LPGA Tour as a professional.

After just 14 LPGA tournaments (22 worldwide tournaments), Ko broke into the Rolex Rankings top-10 at No. 7 by winning her second Tour title on 25 August 2013. She has remained in the Rolex Rankings top-10 for the last 231 consecutive weeks (or ), as of 22 January 2018. Then after her first 44 LPGA tournaments, Ko ascended to the world No. 1 ranking for the first time on 2 February 2015. She was the world No. 1 for 85 weeks until June 2017.

2018
Ko entered 26 tournaments, won once, at the LPGA Mediheal Championship, and finished in the top-10 ten times.

2019 
Ko entered 24 events and finished in the top-10 four times.

2020
Ko entered 13 tournaments and finished in the top-10 four times.

2021 
Ko entered 20 LPGA events, winning once. In April, she won her first LPGA Tour event since 2018 at the 2021 Lotte Championship, Hawaii.

In August, Ko represented New Zealand at the 2021 Summer Olympics, where she won a bronze medal.

Ko won the 2021 Vare Trophy for the lowest scoring average on the LPGA Tour. She closed the trophy out in November by finishing second in a playoff at the Pelican Women's Championship and shooting a final round 64 to finish in the top 10 at the CME Group Tour Championship. Nelly Korda and Ko Jin-young both finished the year with lower scoring averages than Ko but neither completed the required 70 rounds over the season to be eligible for the trophy.

2022 
Ko entered 22 tournaments and won three times. She secured her 17th LPGA win on 30 January at the Gainbridge LPGA at Boca Rio, beating Danielle Kang by one stroke, 274 (14 under par) to Kang's 275 in a back-and-forth lead in the fourth round.

In November, Ko won the CME Group Tour Championship and the record $2 million first prize. With the win, Ko won the season's money title, Vare Trophy for lowest scoring average and the LPGA Player of the Year for 2022.

On 28 November, she returned to the Number 1 ranking for the first time since 2017. Nelly Korda dropped from number 1 for the past two weeks to number 2.

2023 
In February, Ko won the Aramco Saudi Ladies International in Saudi Arabia for the second time. The purse for this Ladies European Tour event was bigger than that of all non-major tournaments on the LPGA Tour and the Ladies European Tour, the winner's cheque was $750,000.

Personal life 
On 30 December 2022, Ko married Chung Jun, the son of the Hyundai Card Vice Chairman Chung Tae-young, at the Myeondong Cathedral in Seoul.

Amateur wins
2011 Australian Women's Amateur Stroke Play Championship, New Zealand Women's Amateur Strokeplay Championship, New Zealand Women's Amateur Matchplay Championship
2012 Australian Women's Amateur, U.S. Women's Amateur, Espirito Santo Trophy (top individual)

Professional wins (26)

LPGA Tour wins (19)

Ko won the 2012 and 2013 CN Canadian Women's Opens as an amateur.
Co-sanctioned by the Ladies European Tour.
Co-sanctioned by the ALPG Tour.

LPGA Tour playoff record (5–2)

Ladies European Tour wins (7)

 Ko won the 2013 ISPS Handa New Zealand Women's Open as an amateur.
 Co-sanctioned by the LPGA Tour.
 Co-sanctioned by the ALPG Tour.

ALPG Tour wins (5)

 Ko won the Bing Lee Samsung Women's NSW Open and the 2013 ISPS Handa New Zealand Women's Open as an amateur.
 Co-sanctioned by the LPGA Tour.
 Co-sanctioned by the Ladies European Tour.

KLPGA Tour wins (1)

Major championships

Wins (2)

Results timeline
Results not in chronological order before 2019 or in 2020.

^ The Evian Championship was added as a major in 2013.

LA = low amateur
CUT = missed the half-way cut
NT = no tournament
T = tied

Summary

Most consecutive cuts made – 21 (2015 U.S. Open – 2019 PGA)
Longest streak of top-10s – 5 (2015 British – 2016 U.S. Women's Open)
Longest streak of top-3s – 5 (2015 British – 2016 U.S. Women's Open)

Summer Olympics (2)

Singles: 2 (1 silver, 1 bronze medal)

LPGA Tour career summary

^ Official as of 5 March 2023

a Includes matchplay and other events without a cut
Notes: 1) Ko turned professional on 23 October 2013, but was not a member of the LPGA Tour. Money earned in 2013 was not considered official by the LPGA Tour. 2) She made the cut in her first 53 LPGA Tour events, with the first 16 being as an amateur. After missing the cut at the 2015 KPMG Women's PGA Championship held 11–14 June, Ko made the next 40 consecutive tour event cuts until she missed her second LPGA cut at the 2017 Kia Classic held 23–26 March.

World ranking
Position in Women's World Golf Rankings (Rolex Rankings) at the end of each calendar year.

^ as of 6 March 2023

 On 2 February 2015, Ko first ascended to the world No. 1 ranking.
 On 12 June 2017, her streak of 85 consecutive weeks (3rd longest all-time) with the No. 1-ranking came to an end when Ariya Jutanugarn won the 2017 Manulife LPGA Classic to move up one spot. Since 2 February 2015, when she first became the world No. 1 golfer, she held the top ranking for 104 total weeks which ranks her 3rd highest, only behind Lorena Ochoa's 158 weeks and Yani Tseng's 109 weeks.
 On 18 July 2016, Ko hit her highest point average of 15.47.
 On 18 July 2016, Ko established her biggest point lead over the No. 2-ranked player. Her 15.47 average was 7.10 points above No. 2-ranked Brooke Henderson's 8.37 average.

Team appearances
Amateur
Espirito Santo Trophy (representing New Zealand): 2010, 2012
Astor Trophy (representing New Zealand): 2011
Queen Sirikit Cup (representing New Zealand): 2010, 2011, 2012

Records and achievements
 On 29 January 2012, became the youngest person to ever win a professional golf tour event (New South Wales Women's Open) at age .
 On 26 August 2012, became the youngest winner of an LPGA Tour event (Canadian Women's Open) at age 
 On 10 February 2013, became the youngest winner of a Ladies European Tour event (ISPS Handa NZ Women's Open) at age .
 On 25 August 2013, became the youngest and only amateur to win two LPGA Tour events – age 15 and 16 (2012 and 2013 Canadian Women's Open)
 On 23 November 2014, became the youngest player to win 5 events on a major tour at age .
 On 23 November 2014, became the youngest and first player to win the biggest payout in LPGA history, taking home US$1.5 million after capturing the tour's season-ending event and winning the inaugural Race to the CME Globe at age . 
 On 23 November 2014, became the youngest rookie player to set an LPGA record for most money earned by a rookie at $2,089,033 at age  – breaking Julieta Granada's 2006 mark of $1,633,586. 
 On 2 February 2015, became the youngest player of either gender to ever be ranked No. 1 in professional golf by both the Official World Golf Ranking and the Rolex World Golf Ranking at age , eclipsing Tiger Woods who was 21 years, 5 months and 15 days when he became men's world number one in 1997 and Jiyai Shin who was 22 years and 5 days when she became women's world number one in 2010.
 On 22 February 2015, became the youngest winner of the ISPS Handa Women's Australian Open title at age .
 On 2 April 2015, tied Annika Sörenstam for the most consecutive rounds under-par in LPGA Tour events, at 29.
 On 15 July 2015, became the youngest winner of Best Female Golfer ESPY Award at age .
 On 13 September 2015, became the youngest player in the "modern era" (post-1900) of either gender to win a major championship at The Evian Championship at age  surpassing Johnny McDermott who was 19 years, 9 months and 14 days when he won his PGA major in 1911 and Morgan Pressel who was 18 years, 10 months and 9 days when she won her LPGA major in 2007.
 On 13 September 2015, her closing round of 63 in the Evian was the record lowest final round in the history of women's golf majors.
 On 26 October 2015, became the youngest player to win 10 events on a major tour at age  surpassing Horton Smith who set the PGA Tour mark of 21 years, 7 months in 1929, and Nancy Lopez who set the previous LPGA Tour record in 1979 at 22 years, 2 months, 5 days.
 On 22 November 2015, became the youngest winner of the LPGA Top Ten Finishes with 17 top ten finishes in 24 events (71%), at age .
 On 22 November 2015, became the youngest winner of the LPGA Official Money List at age .
 On 22 November 2015, became the youngest winner of the LPGA Player of the Year in the 49 years history of the award at age , surpassing Nancy Lopez who won her title at age 21 years, 10 months and 6 days and held the "youngest" title for 37 years. 
 On 22 November 2015, became the youngest MVP/Player of the Year ever across all four major sports and the LPGA/PGA Tour: LPGA - Lydia Ko (18); PGA - Tiger Woods (21); NHL - Wayne Gretzky (19); NFL - Jim Brown (21); NBA - Derrick Rose(22); MLB - Stan Musial, Johnny Bench, Vida Blue (22)
 On 28 December 2015, became the youngest year-end #1 in Rolex Rankings history at age .
 On 3 April 2016, became the youngest player in the "modern era" (post-1900) of either gender to win 2 major championships at the ANA Inspiration at age , surpassing Gene Sarazen who was 20 years, 5 months and 22 days when he won his second PGA major in 1922 and Se Ri Pak who was 20 years, 9 months and 8 days when she won her second LPGA major in 1998.
 On 3 April 2016, became the first New Zealander to win 2 majors. The other New Zealanders who have won a major, Sir Bob Charles and Michael Campbell, have each won one.
 On 11 July 2016, Ko finished T3 at the U.S. Open.  This marked her 5th consecutive top-3 finish in a major.  She finished T3, 1, 1, 2, T3 at the 2015 British Open, 2015 Evian Champ., 2016 ANA Inspiration, 2016 Women's PGA Champ., and 2016 U.S. Open, respectively.
 On 17 July 2016, Ko won the Marathon Classic for her fourth Tour title of the year. It marked her second consecutive year winning at least four Tour titles (she won five Tour titles in 2015). It's also her second consecutive season winning at least US$2.25M and her third consecutive season winning at least US$2.00M.
 On 20 August 2016, became the youngest Olympic medal winner (silver) in women's golf in Rio. She also became New Zealand's youngest individual female medallist at the Olympics.
 In 2016, Ko became only the 3rd woman, after Lorena Ochoa and Yani Tseng, to hold the world No. 1 ranking for all 52 weeks of the year.

Career money records
 On 20 July 2014, became the youngest millionaire ever on the LPGA in her first full season as a pro when she won the Marathon Classic taking her accumulated prize earnings to over US$1 million at age . Ko reached the US$1 million mark in 16 events (5 months 25 days) second fastest behind the record holder Paula Creamer who achieved the US$1 million mark in 16 events (4 months 27 days).
 On 23 November 2014, became the youngest and fastest player to surpass US$2 million in career earnings at age  The previous record holder, Yani Tseng, accomplished this feat in 32 events.  Ko reached the US$2 million mark in just 26 events – the most ever made by a rookie; over US$3 million if include bonus prize of US$1 million for winning the Race to the CME Globe 2014 (CME Globe bonus prize does not count on player's LPGA official earnings)
 On 3 May 2015, became the youngest and fastest player to surpass US$3 million in career earnings at age . The previous record holder, Yani Tseng, accomplished this feat in 53 events.  Ko reached the US$3 million mark in just 35 events.
 On 13 September 2015, became the youngest and fastest player to surpass US$4 million career earnings at age  after winning her first major at the Evian Championship.  The previous record holder, Yani Tseng, accomplished this feat in 65 events.  Ko reached the US$4 million mark in just 45 events.
 On 21 February 2016, became the youngest and fastest player to surpass US$5 million career earnings at age  after finishing second in the Women's Australian Open. The previous record holder, Yani Tseng, accomplished this feat in 76 events.  Ko reached the US$5 million mark in just 52 events.
 On 12 June 2016, became the youngest and fastest player to surpass US$6 million career earnings at age  after finishing second in the KPMG Women's PGA Championship. The previous record holder, Yani Tseng, accomplished this feat in 84 events.  Ko reached the US$6 million mark in just 61 events.
 On 17 July 2016, became the youngest and fastest player to surpass US$7 million career earnings at age  after winning the Marathon Classic, her 4th Tour title of the year. The previous record holder, Yani Tseng, accomplished this feat in 90 events. Ko reached the US$7 million mark in just 65 events.
 On 10 September 2017, became the youngest and fastest player to surpass US$8 million career earnings at age  after finishing 2nd at the Indy Women in Tech Championship. The previous record holder, Yani Tseng, accomplished this feat in 98 events. Ko reached the US$8 million mark in 93 events.
 On 20 November 2022, won $2 million at the CME Group Tour Championship, moving her up to 5th on the LPGA Tour career money list with $16,695,357.

See also
List of golfers with most LPGA major championship wins
List of golfers with most LPGA Tour wins

References

External links

Lydia Ko at Yahoo! Sports
Lydia Ko at SeoulSisters.com
Lydia Ko at HarbourGolf.co.nz

|-

|-

|-

New Zealand female golfers
LPGA Tour golfers
Winners of ladies' major amateur golf championships
Winners of LPGA major golf championships
Olympic golfers of New Zealand
Golfers at the 2016 Summer Olympics
Golfers at the 2020 Summer Olympics
Medalists at the 2016 Summer Olympics
Medalists at the 2020 Summer Olympics
Members of the New Zealand Order of Merit
Olympic silver medalists for New Zealand
Olympic bronze medalists for New Zealand
Olympic medalists in golf
Golfers from Seoul
Golfers from Auckland
People educated at Pinehurst School
New Zealand people of Korean descent
South Korean emigrants to New Zealand
Naturalised citizens of New Zealand
1997 births
Living people